Epiphyas fabricata is a species of moth of the family Tortricidae. It is found in Australia, where it has been recorded from Victoria, New South Wales and Tasmania. The habitat consists of montane forests and wet eucalypt forests.

References

Moths described in 1910
Epiphyas